Bob Bryan and Mike Bryan were the defending champions and successfully defended their title, defeating Jonas Björkman and Max Mirnyi 7–6(11–9), 7–6(7–4) in the final.

Seeds
All seeds receive a bye into the second round.

Draw

Finals

Top half

Bottom half

External links
 Draw

2005 Stella Artois Championships